Al-Mustamsik, (died 1521) was the sixteenth Abbasid caliph of Cairo under the tutelage of the Mamluk Sultanate. He served as caliph twice, his first term from 1497 to 1508 and his second term from 1516 to 1517, when he abdicated the position to his son, al-Mutawakkil III.

References

Bibliography

1521 deaths
15th-century Abbasid caliphs
16th-century Abbasid caliphs
Cairo-era Abbasid caliphs
Year of birth unknown
Sons of Abbasid caliphs